A folding table is a type of folding furniture, a table with legs that fold up against the table top. This is intended to make storage more convenient and to make the table more portable. Many folding tables are made of lightweight materials to further increase portability.

They can be combined with folding chairs.

Description 
Folding tables are produced in many sizes, configurations, and designs. They can be made from plastic, metal, wood, and other materials. Some manufacturers use specialist materials such as engineered wood when producing tables.

Folding mechanism 
There are two main types of folding table. Those that have leaves that fold down such as a Pembroke table, drop-leaf table or gateleg table, and those that fold by having legs that bend on a hinge located at the connection point between the table top and the leg. The leg is designed to fold and fit securely against the underside of the table top, while remaining attached. Because the hinge requires a stable material such as metal for dexterity, some producers use lightweight materials such as aluminium for an increased degree of portability in the folding mechanism.

Uses 
Folding tables are used in homes, schools, churches, and other buildings that have rooms intended for various functions. Folding tables can be used for sit-down activities, and then easily removed and stored out of the way when open space is needed.  Wooden folding tables are also sometimes used as weapons in professional wrestling.

Styles

Card table 
A card table is a square table with legs that fold up individually, with one leg lining each edge. Card tables are traditionally used for playing card games, board games, and other tabletop games. Due to their low cost and small storage size, in the United States they are frequently found in college apartments, or as auxiliary seating for family meals such as Thanksgiving. Many folding card tables are used for specialist games such as contract bridge, Mahjong or poker, as a result there are some folding tables with fabric surfaces such as felt. In the UK, card tables are purpose-designed for cards with a green baize surface and foldaway leaves or legs.

General-use table 

Rectangle, square, and round folding tables are designed for general home and office uses.

Banquet table 

Banquet tables are traditionally used by restaurants and caterers for setting up temporary buffets. They are also popular among retailers and vendors at trade shows for displaying products, and for use as temporary desks.

Personal table 
A personal table, also called a TV tray, is a small table designed to be used by only one person at a time. They are popular for dining while watching television, or for working on small projects. Students often use personal tables for doing homework.

Folding picnic table 
A folding picnic table has built-in seats that fold up along with the legs. They are used commonly in school cafeterias and in the backyards of homes.

Tailgate folding table 
A camping or recreational table specifically designed for the tailgate of pickup trucks. Its patent pending low profile folding mechanism conveniently can be folded up, to use the tailgate as a bench with a picnic table attached. When not in use, it can be folded down and is not in the way. It is useable for outdoor recreational purposes, e.g. camping, hiking, fishing, hunting, sports events, barbecues, tailgating, picnic or in professional environments as outdoor computer desk, meeting table and the like.

Ironing board 
An ironing board is a small, portable, folding table with a heat-resistant top that is used for ironing clothes.

Wallpaper table 
A wallpaper table (or paste or pasting table) is a long, light folding table used by interior decorators. The decorator lays out a strip of wallpaper flat on the table to apply paste so that the wallpaper can then be fixed onto the wall. The table needs to be long to accommodate wallpaper, so other tables typically found in rooms are insufficient, and needs to be light and foldable so that they can be easily transported. Their ease of transportation and assembly means wallpaper tables are sometimes used for other informal purposes such as car boot sales and camping.

Gallery

History 

The history of the folding table may date back as far as ancient Egypt. By the Colonial and Victorian eras, the tables were common.

During the 20th century, folding tables became an inexpensive item manufactured and sold in large quantities.

In the 1940s, Durham Manufacturing Company was marketing a basic model. In 1951, Boris Cohen and Joseph Pucci patented the first table that could be easily carried around. It was widely used by paper-hangers and handymen, and is fairly indistinguishable from present day aluminum folding tables. In the 1950s and 1960s, Falco and Samsonite tables were popular.

In the 1990s and 2000s, American manufacturer Lifetime Products became the world's largest producer of folding tables.

See also 
 Chabudai - in Japan case.
 Drop-leaf table, where the top folds down
 Gateleg table, a drop-leaf table where some of the legs fold inwards as well

References 

Tables (furniture)
Space-saving furniture
Portable furniture